Facer is a single by German band X Marks the Pedwalk. It was released by Zoth Ommog in Europe in CD format.

Summary
Facer is notable for marking a new era in the musical style of X Marks the Pedwalk, which became less harsh and incorporated more elements of electronic body music.  Both the title track and "Missing Light" are considered by many to be among the best X Marks the Pedwalk songs ever.

Track listing
 "Facer" – 5:39
 "Missing Light" – 4:27
 "Ten Miles" – 4:31
 "Facer (X-Tremix)" – 4:18

Personnel
 Sevren Ni-arb (André Schmechta)
 Raive Yarx (Thorsten Schmechta)

External links
Entry at official X Marks the Pedwalk site
Entry at Discogs.com

1995 singles
Industrial songs
X Marks the Pedwalk songs
1995 songs